CPMG Architects is an architectural practice in Nottingham.

History
The practice was established in 1997 from the merger of two local companies, Crampin Pring, and James McArtney. With Jack Gant, the initials of the four architects were used to create the CPMG name.

In 2011 Jack Gant and Bill Crampin retired, and four directors undertook a management buyout of the practice. It opened a branch office in London in 2015. The Birmingham office was opened in 2021

Works
Adams Building, Nottingham 1996-99 restoration for New College Nottingham
Rugby Art Gallery and Museum 2000
Octagon, Derby Road, Nottingham 2000-01 (conversion to apartments)
Elective Orthopaedic Theatres, Nottingham City Hospital 2001
Coopers Square, Burton on Trent 2001
Network Rail HQ, York 2002
Hicks Building, University of Sheffield 2002 (remodelling block of 1955-64)
Boots Building, High Street, Nottingham 2002 (refitting for Zara)
Bristol Airport Air Traffic Control Centre 2004
Moat House Primary School, Coventry 2004
Rolls-Royce Compressions, Sinfin, Derby 2004
Nottingham Squash Club 2004
Radiology Unit, Leicester General Hospital 2005
Student Health Centre, University of Sheffield 2005
Pharmacy Quality Control Unit, Queen's Medical Centre 2006
Moseley Primary School, Coventry 2006
WEBS Training Academy, Beeston, Nottingham 2006
Phoenix Building, Teesside University 2006
Huntingdon Library and Archive 2006
Carnegie Museum, Melton Mowbray 2006
Carrington Point, Nottingham 2006
Bilborough College 2006-07
Binding House, Hucknall Road/Caxton Road, Nottingham 2007
Verde apartments, Glasgow Green 2007
Park Inn Hotel, West George Street/Renfield Street, Glasgow 2007 (formerly the offices of Pearl Assurance)
Aston Customer Service Centre, Rotherham 2007
Cambridgeshire County Council Offices, Huntingdon 2007
Athena Building, Teesside University 2007
Isle of Man Airport Air Traffic Control Centre 2007
RNAS Yeovilton Air Traffic Control Centre 2007
Litmus Building, Huntingdon Street, Nottingham 2008
Huntingdon Criminal Justice Centre 2008
East Midlands Air Traffic Control Centre and Departure Lounge 2009
Darlington Campus, Teesside University 2009
Riverbank Building, Stafford College 2009
Papworth Hospital, Cambridge 2009
The Ear Foundation Projects, Nottingham 2009
Laing O’Rourke ExpLORe Building, Steetley 2009
GlaxoSmithKline, Coleford 2009
12 Smithfield Street, London 2009
Hugh Aston Building, De Montfort University, Leicester 2009
Rolls-Royce Nelson, Barnoldswick 2010
Wolverton Depot, Milton Keynes 2010
Bannerbrook Park, Coventry 2010
Prolog 5, Sherwood Park 2011
Dunelm HQ, Leicester 2011
School of Humanities, University of Nottingham, 2011
Opus Energy HQ, Northampton 2013
Park View House Offices, Nottingham 2014
Kemball School, Stoke-on-Trent 2015
Air Traffic Control Centre, Manchester Airport 2015
Visitor Centre, HMS Belfast, London 2015
Cavendish Road, Nottingham 2015
XP School, Doncaster 2015-16
Student Union hub, Portland Building, University of Nottingham 2015-16.
Castle College, Chilwell
The Gym and Green Wall, Teesside University 2015-16
Quest Academy, Croydon, London 2015-16
Rykneld Primary School, Staffordshire 2015-16
Heathfield Primary School, Kersall Drive, Nottingham 2015-16
Forster Academy, Bradford 2015-16
The Venue, De Montfort University 2015-16
Intercontinental London O2 Hotel, 2016
Little Ilford School PSBP Barking, Dagenham and Newham 2016
Bombardier VShop, Derby 2016
Waterside Campus, University of Northampton 2016-17
Aerospace Integrated Research Centre, Cranfield University 2016-17
Vijay Patel Building, De Montfort University, Leicester 2016
Student Accommodation, Broadgate, Beeston, Nottingham 2016
Central Fire Station, London Road, Nottingham 2016
New Building, BioCity Nottingham 2016-17
Library, Teesside University 2017
Chandos Pole, University of Derby 2017
KP house, Express Buildings, Nottingham 2017
Slimming World HQ, Alfreton, Nottinghamshire 2017-18
Theatre building, Ecclesbourne School, Derbyshire
Walnut Tree Park, Guildford
John Pye Luxury Assets, Old Bond Street, London
Centre Parcs, Elvedon Forest
Cripps Health Centre, Nottingham University

References

Architects from Nottingham
Architecture firms of England